Cat Hills volcanic field is a monogenetic volcanic field located in New Mexico, US.

Description
The field consists of the Cat Hills cones and flows, Wind Mesa, and Isleta volcano and Los Lunas volcano. These are located in close proximity to each other, but show a diversity of compositions and ages. 

I-25 crosses its eastern flank. The volcano has a K-Ar age of 2.78 Ma. Isleta volcano is a cone built over a maar, and consists of alkali olivine basalt.

It shows evidence that flows cascaded from the vent down the escarpment, showing that the volcano is younger than the escarpment. The lavas have been dated at 1.1 to 1.3 Ma based on K-Ar dating, which constrains the age of the Ceja surface and the Ceja Formation. The position on the escarpment means that the peak is imposing viewed from the east (with an apparent topographic prominence of ) but much less so viewed from the west, where the apparent topographic prominence is just . The volcano is composed of andesite erupted from two closely spaced vents.

The youngest volcanoes of the field are the Cat Hills themselves, which form a chain of 23 cinder cones following a hidden fissure that strikes just east of north. All show summit craters and are obviously young. They have been mined extensively for cinder, with one cone quarried completely away by 1978. K-Ar dating gives an age of 0.14 Ma. All are composed of alkali olivine basalt similar to that of Isleta volcano.

The mesa is truncated by faults on both the west and east sides, and is composed of an olivine-bearing basaltic andesite.

Notable vents

See also
List of volcanoes in the United States

References

External links

Volcanic fields of New Mexico
Monogenetic volcanic fields
Pleistocene volcanism